Notah Ryan Begay III (born September 14, 1972) is a Native American professional golfer. He is one of the only Native American golfers to have played in the PGA Tour. Since 2013, Begay has served as an analyst with the Golf Channel and NBC Sports.

Amateur career
Begay was born and raised in Albuquerque, New Mexico, and graduated from a private high school, Albuquerque Academy. He attended Stanford University, where he was a three-time All-American and a teammate of Tiger Woods. He was a member of Stanford's 1994 NCAA Division I Men's Golf Championship team. After graduation, Begay turned professional in 1995.

Professional career

Nike Tour
In 1998, Begay shot a 59 in the second round of the Nike Tour Dominion Open, to join the few golfers to ever shoot a 59 in a professional tournament. He placed 10th on the Nike Tour money list that year, earning a place on the PGA Tour for 1999.

PGA Tour
Begay had a pair of wins in each of his first two seasons on the Tour. From late September 1999 to early July 2000, a period of just over nine months, Begay recorded four PGA Tour wins, with the third and fourth wins coming in successive weeks. Since then, he was plagued by back trouble which put his future as a professional golfer in doubt. In 2005, he played under a "Major Medical Exemption" with little success. In 2006, he played on the Nationwide Tour. At the end of 2006, he successfully earned a card for the European Tour from their qualifying school. In December 2008, he regained his playing card for the 2009 PGA Tour season at Q-school.

Begay has been featured in the top 20 of the Official World Golf Rankings. He successfully utilized a unique putting method. Using a putter with playing faces on both the front and back of the head, he putted right-to-left-breaking putts right-handed, and left-to-right-breaking putts left-handed. Begay is the first top player to use such a technique and putter.

Personal life
Begay is a Native American of the Navajo, San Felipe, and Isleta people. He graduated from Albuquerque Academy in 1990 and earned a Bachelor of Science degree in Economics in 1995 from Stanford University.

In January 2000, Begay was arrested for what he admitted, in court, was actually his second DUI incident. He was sentenced to 364 days in jail with all but seven days suspended.

Begay was named one of Golf Magazine’s Innovators of the Year in 2009 and has also been named one of the Top 100 Sports Educators in the world by the Institute for International Sport.

Begay suffered a heart attack in 2014, while practicing on the putting green at Dallas National Golf Club. He was quickly taken by ambulance to Dallas' Methodist Hospital and a stent was placed in his right coronary artery.

Businesses and Organizations

NB3 Consulting 
In 2002, Begay founded NB3 Consulting, which consults with tribal communities looking to build golf courses for the purpose of economic development. Notable courses the company has built includes Sequoyah National, Firekeeper Golf Course, and Sewailo Golf Club.

Notah Begay III Foundation
In 2005, Begay established the non-profit Notah Begay III Foundation. The immediate goal of the foundation was to provide health and wellness education to Native American youth in the form of soccer and golf programs. The broader purpose of the foundation was to stand as a catalyst for change in the Native American community. On August 26, 2008, the foundation hosted the first Notah Begay III Foundation Challenge at the Turning Stone Resort & Casino, a skins golf match to raise money for the foundation. The five players for the tournament were Begay, Stewart Cink, Vijay Singh, Camilo Villegas and Mike Weir. On August 24, 2009, the foundation hosted its second annual Notah Begay III Foundation Challenge at the Turning Stone Resort & Casino.

KivaSun Foods 
In 2010, Begay founded KivaSun Foods, selling various bison-based products. In 2015, the company won a contract to have 520,000 pounds of bison distributed through the Food Distribution Program on Indian Reservations.

Amateur wins (1)
this list may be incomplete
1995 Northeast Amateur

Professional wins (5)

PGA Tour wins (4)

PGA Tour playoff record (1–0)

Other wins (1)
1998 New Mexico Open

Playoff record
Nike Tour playoff record (0–1)

Results in major championships

CUT = missed the half-way cut
"T" = tied

Summary

Most consecutive cuts made – 4 (2000 Masters – 2000 PGA)
Longest streak of top-10s – 1

Results in The Players Championship

CUT = missed the halfway cut
"T" indicates a tie for a place

Results in World Golf Championships

1Cancelled due to 9/11

"T" = Tied
NT = No tournament

U.S. national team appearances
Amateur
Walker Cup: 1995

Professional
Presidents Cup: 2000 (winners)
Wendy's 3-Tour Challenge (representing PGA Tour): 2000 (winners)

See also
1998 Nike Tour graduates
2006 European Tour Qualifying School graduates
2008 PGA Tour Qualifying School graduates
Lowest rounds of golf

References

External links

Interview with The Times (UK)
Notah Begay III Challenge

American male golfers
Stanford Cardinal men's golfers
PGA Tour golfers
European Tour golfers
Golf writers and broadcasters
Korn Ferry Tour graduates
Navajo sportspeople
Golfers from Albuquerque, New Mexico
1972 births
Living people
20th-century Native Americans
21st-century Native Americans